The following article is a summary of the 2021–22 football season in France, which was the 88th season of competitive football in the country and ran from July 2021 to June 2022.

National team

France national football team

Friendlies

2022 FIFA World Cup qualification

Group D

2021 UEFA Nations League Finals

Final

UEFA Nations League

Group 1

France national under-23 football team

Summer Olympics 

Due to the COVID-19 pandemic, the games have been postponed to the summer of 2021. However, their official name remains 2020 Summer Olympics with the rescheduled 2021 dates have yet to be announced.

Group A

France women's national football team

Friendlies

2023 FIFA Women's World Cup qualification

Group I

2022 Tournoi de France

UEFA competitions

UEFA Champions League

Qualifying rounds

Third qualifying round

|}

Play-off round

|}

Group stage

Group A

Group G

Knockout phase

Round of 16

|}

UEFA Europa League

Group stage

Group A

Group B

Group E

Knockout phase

Round of 16

|}

Quarter-finals

|}

UEFA Europa Conference League

Qualifying phase and play-off round

Play-off round

|}

Group stage

Group G

Knockout phase

Knockout round play-offs

|}

Round of 16

|}

Quarter-finals

|}

Semi-finals

|}

UEFA Youth League

UEFA Champions League Path

Group A

Group G

Domestic Champions Path

First round

|}

Second round

|}

Play-offs

Round of 16

|}

Quarter-finals

|}

UEFA Women's Champions League

Qualifying rounds

Round 1

Semi-finals

|}

Final / Third-place play-off

|}

Round 2

|}

Group stage

Group B

Group D

Knockout phase

Quarter-finals

|}

Semi-finals

|}

Final

League season

Men

Ligue 1

Ligue 2

Championnat National

Women

Division 1 Féminine

Cup competitions

2021–22 Coupe de France

Final

2021 Trophée des Champions

2021–22 Coupe de France Féminine

References 

2021–22 in French football
Seasons in French football
2021 in association football
2022 in association football